Håkon and Kristin were the official mascots of the 1994 Winter Olympics and Sondre was the official mascot of the 1994 Winter Paralympics, both held in Lillehammer, Norway.

Håkon and Kristin are two happy Norwegian children, a boy and a girl, both dressed in Viking clothes. Although they wear medieval clothes referring to their historical roots, they are the children of today and express interests and visions of youth as environmental awareness. The mascots are created by author Kari Werner and her husband illustrator Werner Grossmann  from an idea of architect Javier Ramirez Campuzano, who had designed the corporate identity of the Mexico Pavilion for the 1994 Winter Olympic Games.

Eight pairs of Norwegian children, each representing a region of the country, were selected from about 10,000 subscribers aged 10 to 11 years old to play the mascots.

Two venues of the 1994 Winter Olympics located side by side, had the same name as the Mascots: the Håkons Hall and Kristins Hall.

For the Paralympic Games, the committee subsequently requested  visual artists Tor Lindrupsen and Janne Solem for the creation of a new mascot along the creative lines of Håkon and Kristin. They created Sondre, an amputated troll to represent Norse mythology origins.

Historical basis
The mascots' names refer to historical figures from the thirteenth century whose fate is closely linked to Norway and the protagonist that Lillehammer region area had on that conflict: Håkon IV who was the king of Norway between 1217 and 1263 and Princess Kristin Sverrisdóttir, his aunt. They lived in Norway during a time of a conflict between the Birkebeiner and the Bagler clans. When Håkon Håkonson was a small child he had to escape Lillehammer through the mountains with his supporters due to threatening by the Baglers. The Princess of the Birkebeiner, Kristin Sverrisdottir, married meanwhile the chief of the Baglers Filippus Simonsson in the sake of peace between the two groups.

References

1994 Winter Olympics
1994 Winter Paralympics
Olympic mascots
Paralympic mascots
Fictional dolls and dummies
Fictional trolls
Fictional Norwegian people
Fictional children